"The Scofflaw" is the 99th episode of the NBC sitcom Seinfeld. It was the 13th episode for the sixth season. It aired on January 26, 1995. In this episode, George and Jerry both pretend to not know their friend Gary Fogel (played by Jon Lovitz) never had cancer, Elaine takes revenge on her ex-boyfriend by acquiring a pair of glasses identical to his, and Kramer teams up with a police officer to catch a repeat parking violator.

Plot
George runs into an old friend, Gary Fogel, who says he spent the last few months undergoing chemotherapy. Jerry tells George he knew about Gary's cancer but swore not to tell because George cannot keep secrets. Kramer sees Elaine's ex-boyfriend Jake Jarmel on TV and wants a pair of eyeglasses like his. Jake refuses to tell Kramer where he got them; he wants his to be unique. Kramer tells Elaine about the encounter. He mentions that he told Jake she said hi, which Elaine thinks eliminates her advantage in the "post-break up relationship". She confronts Jake at his book signing to tell him she did not say hi, but he points out that doing this is even more of a gesture than if she had actually said hi.

Kramer calls a litterbug a "pig". A cop behind him thinks Kramer called him a pig, which distracts him from arresting a driver, who then flees. Later, Kramer explains the misunderstanding to the police officer. The cop says he's spent years tracking a scofflaw who has racked up more parking tickets than anybody else in the city. The cop, who has an eyepatch, considers the scofflaw his "White Whale." Kramer decides to get an eyepatch like his. However, the patch impairs his vision.

George is bitter at Gary for not telling him about his cancer. To soothe things, Gary offers George a parking spot and tells him another secret: while doctors thought he had cancer, surgery revealed there was nothing wrong with him. George is stunned and compulsively tells Jerry. Jerry is angry because he bought Gary a gift certificate for baldness treatment out of sympathy. George insists that Jerry pretend he doesn't know so George can get his parking spot.

Gary gets a toupee, which gives him the confidence to talk to a quiet, beautiful woman who sits in a corner booth at Monk's Café. George takes Debby for a drive after Gary tells George she said hi to him. Debby tells George she didn't actually say hi, and is in love with Gary because of his supposed battle against cancer.

Elaine buys eyeglasses identical to Jake's from a man on the street, then taunts Jake with them in revenge for his perceived smugness. Afterward she gives the glasses to Mr. Lippman, who is starting a publishing company. At a book presentation, Jake is irate to see Lippman wearing the glasses, and attacks him. The man who sold his glasses to Elaine blindly walks across the street, causing a car accident. The police officer is distracted by the accident and loses his White Whale once again. Kramer recognizes Newman as the scofflaw, and convinces him to turn himself in. A traffic court judge rules that Newman's car must be kept in a garage, at his own expense, until his parking tickets are paid off.

Inspired by Gary's success with the woman in Monk's, George shops for a toupee. Jerry tags along to voice his disapproval for the idea. Gary arrives, needing a readjustment to his "rug"; he says he can't give the parking spot to George because the judge needs it for Newman's car. George gives Jerry the okay to stop pretending and he confronts Gary, ripping the toupee off his head. Later on, George, wearing a toupee, arrives at Monk's and gets the attention of a beautiful woman.

Production
Jerry Seinfeld had once heard Keith Richards say "How's your life? All right?", and added it to George's dialogue. Kramer's line "I want to be a pirate," a callback to "The Puffy Shirt", was added to the scene between takes.

References

External links 
 

Seinfeld (season 6) episodes
1995 American television episodes